Athar Qureshi (1925–18 December 2000) was a prominent Pakistani politician and a religious leader. A member of Jamaat-e-Islami, he was also elected as a member of Sindh Provincial Assembly from 1985-1988.

Early life 
Qureshi was born in 1925 in the Azamgarh district of Uttar Pradesh, British India, and attended Aligarh Muslim University. He migrated to Karachi along with his family in the early 1950s.

Political life 
Dr Athar Qureshi became politically active at Aligarh University, where he joined student wing of the Muslim League. Later, he became part of Jamaat-e-Islami Pakistan under the leadership of Abul A'la Maududi along with Abdul Ghafoor Ahmed. In the 1970s, he was elected as the General Secretary of the party. In 1985, he was elected as a Member of the Sindh Provincial Assembly, representing the PS-84 Constituency.

He subsequently left Jamaat-e-Islami and joined Tehreek-Islami, serving as chief for the provinces of Sindh and Balochistan. He supported the introduction of Sharia law in Pakistan.

Death 
On the morning of 18 December 2000, he was assassinated in front of his home in North-Nazimabad, Karachi.

References

External links 
 https://www.tehrantimes.com/news/55229/Gunmen-Kill-Former-Religious-Party-Leader-in-Karachi
 https://www.dawn.com/news/153356/karachi-attack-on-ghafoor-s-house-a-plot-jamaat-not-interested-in-peace-says-mqm

1925 births
2000 deaths
Jamiat Ulema-e-Islam (F) politicians